Maria C. Freire is a Peruvian-American biophysicist who was the president and executive director of the Foundation for the National Institutes of Health (FNIH) from 2012-2021. She also is a member of the U.S. National Academy of Medicine and Council on Foreign Relations. Freire works in global health, technology commercialization and intellectual property management, focusing on the discovery, development and access to medical interventions.

Education
A native of Lima, Peru, Freire trained at the Universidad Peruana Cayetano Heredia. She received a Ph.D. in biophysics from the University of Virginia and completed postgraduate work in immunology and virology at the University of Virginia and at the University of Tennessee, respectively, and at the John F. Kennedy School of Government, Harvard University. She is the recipient of a Fulbright Fellowship as well as two AAAS Congressional Science Fellowships, sponsored by the Biophysical Society and the American Society for Photobiology.

Career
Freire was the president of the Albert and Mary Lasker Foundation. From 2001 to 2008, she was the president and chief executive officer of the Global Alliance for TB Drug Development, a not-for-profit organization that develops drugs to fight tuberculosis.

Freire directed the Office of Technology Transfer at the National Institutes of Health from 1995 to 2001, where she oversaw the transfer of federally funded technology from the not-for-profit sector to the for-profit sector. Prior to that, Freire established and headed the Office of Technology Development at the University of Maryland, Baltimore and the University of Maryland, Baltimore County.

Other activities
Freire was a member of the Leadership Group of Accelerating COVID-19 Therapeutics and Vaccines (ACTIV). She was a member of the Science Board of the U.S. Food and Drug Administration (FDA) and served as chair from 2013 to 2015; is the chair of the business advisory board of the Institute for Biomedical Research, Barcelona, Spain has served as a member of the Commission on the Global Health Risk Framework for the Future of the National Academy of Medicine and the executive committee of the United Nations’ Sustainable Development Solutions Network. Freire also served as a member of the UN Secretary General High Level Panel on Access to Medicines. She also was selected as one of ten commissioners of the World Health Organization's Commission on Intellectual Property Rights, Innovation and Public Health (CIPIH) and served as a member on the International Advisory Committee for the Carlos Slim Health Institute.

In 2008, Freire was elected to the Institute of Medicine (National Academy of Medicine) and is currently a member of its Cecil Awards Selection Committee. Freire was elected to the Council on Foreign Relations in 2009 and serves on its Committee on Membership. She serves on the Board of Directors of Exelixis, Inc., and since April 2012, has served as a director on the board of the Alexandria Real Estate Equities, Inc.

Selected awards
2017 Washington Business Journal's Women Who Mean Business Award
2017 Stevie Award for Woman of the Year in the government/nonprofit category
2019 NonProfit PRO "Executive of the Year" Award,

References

External links
 Institute of Medicine of the National Academies
 Global Health Council
 Alexandria Real Estate Equities, Inc.

Year of birth missing (living people)
Living people
National Institutes of Health people
People from Lima
American people of Peruvian descent
United States National Academy of Medicine
University of Virginia alumni